is an action-adventure video game developed and published by Konami for the PlayStation, which was released in Japan in March 1996. The game is part of the Goemon series.

Story 
One night, Goemon awakens from his sleep to some huge noise, so he and Ebisumaru decide to go and investigate. The pair find out that it is an alien, and that Edo is being invaded.

Development and gameplay 

Gameplay is rather similar to Ganbare Goemon 3, as there is a main map in a top-down perspective, which leads to various 2D side-scrolling levels. Being that it is the first Ganbare Goemon title released for the PlayStation, it experimented with graphics such as showing inward depth during the overhead map portions.

The soundtrack contains both new tracks and remixes of older tracks from previous entries in the series, which was handled by Akira Yamaoka, Michiru Yamane, Takayuki Fujii, Motoaki Furukawa, Tappi Iwase, "Latino", Hiroshi Tamawari, and Shoichiro Hirata.

References

1996 video games
Ganbare Goemon games
Japan-exclusive video games
PlayStation (console) games
PlayStation Network games
Video games developed in Japan
Video games scored by Akira Yamaoka
Video games scored by Michiru Yamane

Single-player video games